Domrémy-la-Pucelle is a commune in the Vosges department in Grand Est in northeastern France.

The village, originally named Domrémy, is the birthplace of Joan of Arc. It has since been renamed Domrémy-la-Pucelle after Joan's nickname,  ("the Maid of Orléans").

Geography
The village land includes a small wooded hill to the west of the houses, which rises to a height of 407 metres (1335'), known as the Domrémy Wood. This overlooks the small adjacent settlement of Les Roises.

History
Domrémy and Greux were exempted from taxes "forever" by Charles VII in 1429. It was the sole request made of the king by Joan of Arc when Charles asked her how he could show her his appreciation for seeing him crowned; Joan felt that taxes burdened the villagers. Moreover, he wished to do a good deed for her success in fighting the English during the Hundred Years' War. Taxes were imposed upon Domrémy and Greux again during the French Revolution; the residents have paid taxes since.

Until 1766, Domrémy was part of the Duchy of Bar (within a section of the duchy which owed fealty to the Crown of France although the other half of the duchy was part of the Holy Roman Empire). In that year, the Duchy, part of which had become a fief of the Kingdom of France in 1301, escheated to the crown fully upon the death of its last duke, Stanisław Leszczyński.

Demographics

Gallery

See also
Communes of the Vosges department

References

External links

 Domrémy-la-Pucelle official website

Communes of Vosges (department)